Roy Oxlade (13 January 1929 – 15 February 2014) was an English painter, writer on art, and an art educator.

Biography

Roy Oxlade was born in Tottenham, England to Emily and William Oxlade. He was educated at the Bromley School of Art and Goldsmiths in London, and was a student of David Bomberg for two years at the Borough Polytechnic. He received his PhD from the Royal College of Art. His PhD thesis was on David Bomberg and titled, Bomberg and the Borough: An Approach to Drawing.

While studying at Goldsmiths, Oxlade met the painter, Rose Wylie, a fellow student, and they married in 1957.

Roy Oxlade: Work from the 80s & 90s (2018), the first solo exhibition of Oxlade's work since his death, received critical acclaim and coverage in numerous publications including Frieze, ArtLyst and Mousse.

In 2019, it was announced that Oxlade would be the subject of the inaugural exhibition at Hastings Contemporary, Hastings, United Kingdom.

Paintings
Oxlade is quoted in a 2013 exhibition review:

"Painting to me is like a room of the imagination. It’s up to me what I do with it. I choose its size and its materials – usually canvas and oil paint. At the beginning its relationships don’t amount to much – it’s a rectangle in a jumble of art history I relate to. There would not be much fun in leaving the room empty, a passive – one colour field – a blank canvas. And entirely abstract forms place too many restrictions on dialogue. So I have put in some other stuff, some characters, some actors – tables, pots, colours, easels, lamps, scribbles, figures and faces to interact with each other. I adjust the temperature, open the windows, shut the windows, throw things out, change the lighting."

In a written dialogue with the painter Marcus Reichert in 2003, Oxlade said:

"Like poetry, painting’s got its own language of metaphor: I think of van Gogh’s The Night Café, a bowl of flowers by Rousseau, many Matisses: the aubergines still life in Grenoble, Music, the Red Dessert. Matisse sometimes managed to achieve wonderfully direct drawing within his painting like he does with the box of pencils in the Red Studio. Aren’t these paintings modernism? A rich vein, you could call it metaphorical modernism; it makes the rest of painting, ancient and modern, so much framed tedium. They’re a hundred years old, but that’s not so long in the scale of things. Do they mark the end of what’s possible? Spengler? Gombrich? We don’t need them to remind us; it’s obvious that ‘we’ve lost faith in our own culture’. The rush to abstraction was a diversion, the dismantling too fast; the dialogue dried up – in abstraction there were no metaphors to make. Philip Guston made a defiant counter-attack but just now the language of painting seems to be foreign. But when cat-walk art has finally imploded perhaps there can be a fresh and essentially evaluative look at metaphorical modernism. That could initiate a continuation of representational painting."

In his essay of 2009, There's An Iceberg Up Ahead, Oxlade wrote:

"Desperate measures for desperate times; what is the role of art at a time of global emergency? Art’s first response must be to release itself from its old myths. For centuries art has been so closely tied to the prevailing ideology that any need to adjust our way of life in a way that will make a difference to the planet’s current problems will mean that art too must rethink its position fundamentally. Art History is the ‘official’ art history and as such it stands monumentally as the custodian of the iconography of our mercantile past, itself currently on trial. The store rooms of our art galleries and museums bulge with artefacts illustrating the evolution not only of realist art but also the story it tells of unworthy heroes and their inglorious lives. Certainly, the history of art is sprinkled with outstanding exceptions, where art escapes from social conformity, and the great value and significance of those exceptions must not be overlooked. Yet, if these are indeed desperate times should we not be considering how much of it should go? Michelangelo, Leonardo, Rembrandt, Vermeer, Titian, Velazquez – even the greatest are all deeply implicated in a history of narcissism and literalism. Such art, because of an apparent brilliance which goes unquestioned, is especially dangerous when it provides the cultural underpinning of a society now in need of different support."

Personal
Oxlade and Wylie's three children are Luke-John, Elizabeth, and Henrietta.

Bibliography

Essays

References

General references

External links

1929 births
2014 deaths
Alumni of Goldsmiths, University of London
20th-century English painters
English male painters
21st-century English painters
People from Tottenham
English contemporary artists
20th-century English male artists
21st-century English male artists